The Latelhorn (also known as Punta di Saas) is a mountain of the Pennine Alps, located on the border between Switzerland and Italy. It lies between the valleys of Saas (Valais) and Antrona (Piedmont), just north of the Antrona Pass.

References

External links
 Latelhorn on Hikr

Mountains of the Alps
Alpine three-thousanders
Mountains of Switzerland
Mountains of Italy
Italy–Switzerland border
Mountains of Valais